Kurchatovsky District is the name of several administrative and municipal districts in Russia.

Districts of the federal subjects

Kurchatovsky District, Kursk Oblast, an administrative and municipal district of Kursk Oblast

City divisions
Kurchatovsky City District, Chelyabinsk, an administrative and municipal city district of Chelyabinsk, the administrative center of Chelyabinsk Oblast

See also
Kurchatov (disambiguation)

References